Celtic Football Club is a Scottish professional football club based in Parkhead, Glasgow. The club was founded in 1887 and played their first match in May 1888, a friendly match against Rangers. The club played their first competitive match in September 1888, when they entered the first round of the 1888–89 Scottish Cup. Since playing their first competitive match, more than 200 players have made at least 100 appearances (including substitute appearances); those players are listed here. Other players who have made fewer appearances are also included where they are regarded as having played a significant role for the club, with the reason for their inclusion indicated in the Notes column.

Celtic's record appearance-maker is Billy McNeill, who made a total of 790 appearances in major competitions over an 18-year playing career. Alec McNair holds the record at Celtic for most league appearances, and is also the oldest player to have competed for the club. Jimmy McGrory is the club's top goalscorer with 472 goals in major competitions. He is also the record goalscorer in British football, with a total of 550 goals in competitive first class matches. Henrik Larsson has more appearances for Celtic than any other player from outwith the British Isles. He is also the club's third highest goalscorer of all time, behind McGrory and Bobby Lennox, with 242 goals in all competitions. Jimmy Johnstone, part of Celtic's European Cup winning Lisbon Lions team alongside McNeill and Lennox, was voted by Celtic supporters in 2002 as the club's greatest ever player.

James Kelly was the club's first ever captain, playing in the club's inaugural game against Rangers in 1888. He later served as a director and then as chairman. He effectively founded the Kelly dynasty of directors at Celtic, who by and large controlled the club until 1994. Other club captains also went on to important roles at Celtic after the end of their playing careers, with Jimmy McStay, Jimmy McGrory, Jock Stein, Billy McNeill, Davie Hay and Neil Lennon all going on to manage the side. Scott Brown, who played 620 games for the club and was captain throughout the 2010s, is also the Celtic player to have captained the Scotland international team the most times. Paul McStay, who captained Celtic during the 1990s, has won the most caps for Scotland whilst at Celtic with 76 appearances, whilst Pat Bonner of the Republic of Ireland has made the most appearances for his country whilst a Celtic player (80 caps).

Notable players
Players are listed according to the date they first signed with the club. Appearances and goals are for competitive first-team matches in Scottish League, Scottish Cup, Scottish League Cup and European Competition only; minor competitions (i.e. the Glasgow Cup) and wartime matches are excluded. Substitute appearances are included.

For a full list of all Celtic players with Wikipedia articles see Category:Celtic F.C. players. For player appearance records see Celtic F.C. records.

Key

.Appearances correct as of match played 6 March 2022

Club captains

Footnotes
Citations/ sources for each note are included in the "Notable players" section above:

References

External links
A full list of former Celtic players can be found at: Celtic – FitbaStats – Player List
More detailed biographies on players can be found at: The Celtic Wiki: All time A to Z of Celtic players

 
Players
Celtic
Players
Association football player non-biographical articles